Alan Frizzell (born 14 April 1995 in Greenock) is a Scottish footballer playing with WoSFL Premiership side Kilbirnie Ladeside.

He started his career with local side Greenock Morton, before turning Junior with Port Glasgow. He then had spells with Dumbarton, Largs Thistle, Clydebank, Neilston Juniors, Greenock Juniors, and Broomhill.

Career

Frizzell made his senior debut for Morton at the age of 17, as a substitute against Raith Rovers on 5 May 2012. This was an immediate step-up from the U17 side, as he had never played for the club at U19 level. He had scored in the Renfrewshire Cup against Gourock Thistle in the previous midweek match.

Already with a career outside of football, Frizzell chose not to go full-time with Morton and he instead joined local Junior club Port Glasgow. He spent a season at the Port, before returning to senior football when Ian Murray signed him for Scottish Championship side Dumbarton.

Frizzell left Dumbarton in 2014 to sign for Largs Thistle; leaving the club two years later to sign for Neilston Juniors.

After two seasons at Brig O'Lea, Frizzell joined his home town club Greenock Juniors.

Frizzell moved to Kilbirnie Ladeside in June 2020 but was released after the club decided to take a season out due to the current COVID-19 pandemic and signed for Benburb F.C. After only one match, Benburb also chose to take a season out and he joined Troon.

Personal life
Frizzell is the older brother of Airdrieonians winger Adam Frizzell.

Frizzell is an electrician as well as a part-time footballer.

See also
Greenock Morton F.C. season 2011–12

References

External links

1995 births
Living people
Scottish footballers
Footballers from Greenock
Association football midfielders
Greenock Morton F.C. players
Scottish Football League players
Scottish Junior Football Association players
Dumbarton F.C. players
Largs Thistle F.C. players
Neilston Juniors F.C. players
Clydebank F.C. players
Greenock Juniors F.C. players
Lowland Football League players
Benburb F.C. players
Broomhill F.C. (Scotland) players
Troon F.C. players
West of Scotland Football League players